Chapssal-tteok, also called chaltteok, is a tteok, or Korean rice cake, made of glutinous rice.

Etymology 
Chapssal-tteok is a compound noun consisting of chapssal, meaning "glutinous rice," and tteok, meaning "rice cake." 

The word chapssal is derived from the Middle Korean chɑl, meaning "glutinous," and psɑl, meaning "rice." Chɑlpsɑl appears in Gugeup ganibang, a 1489 book on medicine. The word became chɑppsɑl with consonant cluster reduction and then became chɑpsɑl with degemination. Due to the loss of the vowel ɑ as well as syllable-initial consonant clusters, the word became chapssal with the syllable boundary between coda p and onset ss. Tteok is derived from the Middle Korean sdeok, which appears in Worin seokbo, a 1459 biography and eulogy of the Buddha. 

The word chaltteok is a compound consisting of the attributive adjective chal, meaning "glutinous," and tteok. Chal is derived from the Middle Korean chɑl, and the word chɑlsdeok appears in Geumganggyeong Samga hae, a 1482 book on the Diamond Sūtra.

Accordingly, chaltteok can mean tteok made of glutinous grains other than rice, such as glutinous sorghum, but chapssal-tteok can only refer to tteok that is made of glutinous rice. In most cases, however, the words are used interchangeably, as tteok is most often made with glutinous or non-glutinous rice.

Preparation and varieties 
Chapssal-tteok can be prepared in several ways. Glutinous rice is soaked, ground into flour, and then steamed in a siru (rice cake steamer). The rice may or may not then be pounded. Sometimes, the rice is ground after being steamed instead of before.

Chapssal-tteok can be coated with gomul (powdered sesame or beans) and steamed, or it may be boiled and then coated. Chapssal-tteok can also be made round and filled with various so (fillings) such as red bean paste.

Chapssal-tteok ice cream is popular in modern South Korea.

Chapssal-tteok is featured in some fusion Korean dishes.

Similar food 
Some Japanese mochi varieties are very similar to certain chapssal-tteok varieties.  Both may be made by steaming and pounding soaked glutinous rice.

See also 
 List of Korean desserts

References 

Glutinous rice dishes
Tteok